Mediterranean Exploration Company, or MEC, is a Mediterranean restaurant in Portland, Oregon's Pearl District, in the United States.

Reception 
Kara Stokes and Maya MacEvoy included Cooperativa in Eater Portland 2022 overview of "Where to Eat and Drink in Portland’s Pearl District".

References

External links

 
 
 
 
 

European-American culture in Portland, Oregon
Mediterranean restaurants in Oregon
Pearl District, Portland, Oregon
Restaurants in Portland, Oregon